Dryopteris cycadina, the shaggy shield fern or black wood fern, is a species of deciduous or semi-evergreen fern in the family Dryopteridaceae, native to northern India, China, Taiwan and Japan.

It has gained the Royal Horticultural Society's Award of Garden Merit.

References

cycadina